The 2011–12 Biathlon World Cup – Sprint Women will start on Saturday December 3, 2011 in Östersund and will finish Friday March 16, 2012 in Khanty-Mansiysk. Defending titlist is Magdalena Neuner of Germany.

Competition format
The 7.5 kilometres sprint race is the third oldest biathlon event; the distance is skied over three laps. The biathlete shoots two times at any shooting lane, first prone, then standing, totalling 10 targets. For each missed target the biathlete has to complete a penalty lap of around 150 metres. Competitors' starts are staggered, normally by 30 seconds.

2010-11 Top 3 Standings

Medal winners

Standings

References

- Sprint Women, 2011-12 Biathlon World Cup